South Ward School is a historic school building located at Bellefonte, Centre County, Pennsylvania.  It was built in 1887, and is a large, two-story, Victorian eclectic brick building.  It measures 100 feet by 50 feet, has a hip roof, and has Italianate and Queen Anne design elements.  The building features a three-story bell tower with a steeply pitched hipped roof. The building has been converted to apartments.

It was added to the National Register of Historic Places in 1978.

References

School buildings on the National Register of Historic Places in Pennsylvania
Italianate architecture in Pennsylvania
Queen Anne architecture in Pennsylvania
School buildings completed in 1887
Schools in Centre County, Pennsylvania
National Register of Historic Places in Centre County, Pennsylvania